George Colțea (born 17 May 2000) is a Romanian biathlete who competed at the 2022 Winter Olympics. His coach is Gheorghe Garnita.

References

Living people
2000 births
Romanian male biathletes
People from Brașov County
Biathletes at the 2022 Winter Olympics
Olympic biathletes of Romania